Naravas (Old Libyan: Nrbs(h);) was a Numidian chief in the Mercenary War of the Carthaginian state.  Naravas is the Greek form of Narbal or Naarbaal.

Alliance with Hamilcar Barca
During the Punic Wars, Naravas had joined the army of Spendius.  During a critical time, he switched his allegiance to Hamilcar Barca of Carthage.  

In 239 BC, he arrived at Hamilcar's camp with 2,000 horsemen.  This probably saved the Carthaginian army from destruction. His troops pushed back the mercenaries of Mathos, the Libyan chief, at the Battle of Bagradas River.  After the battle, he took possession of the town of Utica.

Family
Naravas married the third daughter of Hamilcar Barca, the sister of Hannibal. Her name is unknown, but Gustave Flaubert gave her the name Salammbo in his novel of that name.

References

External links
 Dictionary of Greek and Roman Biography and Mythology, page 1138
 Cannae: the Experience of Battle in the Second Punic War.

3rd-century BC Berber people
Ancient mercenaries
Numidia
Place of birth unknown
Year of birth missing
Mercenary War